Piz Nair (3,059 m) is a mountain of the Glarus Alps, located on the border between the Swiss cantons of Uri and Graubünden. Together with Piz Giuv (3,096 m) on the west, it overlooks the end of the Etzli valley in the canton of Uri. The south-west and the south-east sides overlook respectively the small valleys of Val Giuv and Val Milà, both converging to the Rhine valley west of Sedrun (Graubünden). The mountain is politically divided between the municipalities of Silenen (Uri) and Tujetsch (Graubünden).

On the northern side of Piz Nair lies a small glacier, the Fellelifirn. Large lateral moraines can be seen below the glacier.

References

Mountains of Graubünden
Mountains of the canton of Uri
Mountains of the Alps
Alpine three-thousanders
Graubünden–Uri border
Mountains of Switzerland
Tujetsch